Maria McBane (born 8 February 1946 in Bilbao, Spain) is a Spanish American model and actress who was Playboy magazine's Playmate of the Month for its May 1965 issue. Her centerfold was photographed by Ed DeLong and William Figge.

Maria moved to the United States at the age of 7 and grew up in Detroit.  She appeared in one film, Fireball 500 (1966), playing the part of "Leander Fan."  In this film, her credit appeared as Marie McBane.

Maria now lives in Hawaii. According to The Playmate Book, by 1996 she ran for the Hawaii legislature, prompted in part by her and her husband losing their restaurant in a  land dispute.

See also
 List of people in Playboy 1960–1969

External links 
  
 

1946 births
Living people
Actors from Avignon
1960s Playboy Playmates
French emigrants to the United States